Route 385 is a provincial highway located in the Côte-Nord region in eastern Quebec. The highway runs from the junction of Route 138 in Forestville and ends over 80 kilometers further north into large wooded areas which the main purpose of the road is for the wood industry in the Côte-Nord region.

Towns along Route 385

 Forestville
 Labrieville

See also

 List of Quebec provincial highways

References

External links 
 Official Transports Quebec Map 
 Route 385 on Google Maps

385